The  was an important administrative and political office in the Tokugawa shogunate.  The office was the personal representative of the military dictators Oda Nobunaga and Toyotomi Hideyoshi in Kyoto, the seat of the Japanese Emperor, and was adopted by the Tokugawa shōguns. The significance and effectiveness of the office is credited to the third Tokugawa shōgun, Tokugawa Iemitsu, who developed these initial creations as bureaucratic elements in a consistent and coherent whole. 

The office was similar to the Rokuhara Tandai of the 13th- and 14th-century Kamakura shogunate.  Tandai was the name given to governors or chief magistrates of important cities under the Kamakura shogunate.  The office became very important under the Hōjō regents and was always held by a trusted member of the family.

Description
The office was expanded and its duties codified as an office in the Tokugawa shogunate. The shoshidai, usually chosen from among the fudai daimyōs, was the shōgun's deputy in the Kyoto region, and was responsible for maintaining good relations and open communication between the shogunate and the imperial court.  The shoshidai also controlled the access of the daimyōs to the Court.  He was responsible for overseeing the Imperial court's finances, for ensuring the emperor's personal security, and for guarding the safety of the court. For example, the shoshidai supported the Kyoto magistrate or municipal administrator (the machi-bugyō) in making positive policy about firefighting for the royal palaces. In this context, the shoshidai collaborated with the administrator of the reigning sovereign's court (the kinri-zuki bugyō)  and the administrator of the ex-emperor's court (the sendō-zuki bugyō), both of whom were shogunate appointees.  The shoshidai also headed a network of spies tasked with discovering and reporting any covert sources of sedition, insurrection or other kinds of unrest.

As Governor-general of Kyoto and the surrounding eight provinces, the shoshidai was responsible for collecting taxes and for other duties within this region.  The municipal administrators of Nara and Fushimi, in addition to Kyoto's municipal governance, the Kyoto deputy (the daikan), and the officials of the Nijō Palace were all subordinate to the shoshidai. He was empowered to hear suits-at-law and he had oversight control of all temples and shrines.  The shoshidai had a force of constables (yoriki) and policemen (dōshin)  under their command.

In addition to administrative duties, the shoshidai's participation in ceremonial events helped to consolidate the power and influence of the shogunate.  For example, in September 1617, a Korean delegation was received by Hidetada at Fushimi Castle, and the shoshidai was summoned for two reasons (1) for the Koreans, to underscore the importance accorded the embassy, and (2) for the kuge courtiers in attendance, to make sure that they were properly impressed.

It was eventually established that service as governor of Osaka (the judai) was a prerequisite for appointment as shoshidai. A close, personal link with the shōgun was maintained through visits to Edo every five or six years to report directly to the shōgun. The conventional route of promotion was from governor of Osaka to shoshidai of Kyoto and then to rōjū (member of the Shogunate's governing council). The shoshidai earned 10,000 koku annually, in addition to the income from his own domain.

Abolition
In September 1862, a concurrent, nearly co-equal office was created, the "Kyoto shugoshoku", in an attempt to strengthen the  faction. The related office of the shugoshoku had essentially the same functions as that of the shoshidai, but it was considered the senior of the two; and only members of the Matsudaira family were appointed.

The last Kyoto shoshidai, Matsudaira Sadaaki, came from a collateral Tokugawa branch.  As a practical matter, it could be said that this office ended with his resignation in 1867; but matters were not so unclouded in that time. After the Imperial edict sanctioning the restoration of Imperial government (November 1867), there was a time lag before the office of shoshidai was abolished (January 1868) and affairs of the city were temporarily entrusted to the clans of Sasayama (Aoyama), Zeze (Honda) and Kameyama (Matsudaira).

List of Kyoto shoshidai

See also
 Bugyō
 Rokuhara Tandai

Notes

References
 Bolitho, Harold. (1974). Treasures Among Men: The Fudai Daimyo in Tokugawa Japan. New Haven: Yale University Press.  ;  OCLC 185685588
 Beasley, W. G. (1955).  Select Documents on Japanese Foreign Policy, 1853-1868. London: Oxford University Press. Reprinted by RoutledgeCurzon, London, 2001.  
 Brinkley, Frank and Baron Kikuchi. (1915). A History of the Japanese People from the Earliest Times to the End of the Meiji Era. New York: Encyclopædia Britannica.
 Murdoch, James and Isoh Yamagata. (1903–1926). London: Kegan Paul, Trubner. OCLC 502662122
 Nussbaum, Louis Frédéric and Käthe Roth. (2005). Japan Encyclopedia. Cambridge: Harvard University Press. ; OCLC 48943301
 Ponsonby-Fane, Richard. (1956). Kyoto: The Old Capital of Japan, 794-1869. Kyoto: The Ponsonby Memorial Society. 
 Toby, Ronald P. (1984). State and Diplomacy in Early Modern Japan: Asia in the Development of the Tokugawa Bakufu. Princeton: Princeton University Press.  ;  OCLC 9557347

 
Officials of the Tokugawa shogunate